William Eyre may refer to:

William Eyre (died 1629), MP for Heytesbury and Wiltshire
William Eyre (leveller) (fl. 1634–1675), English Parliamentary army officer in the English Civil War and a Leveller
William Eyre of Neston (fl. 1642–1660), parliamentarian army officer and politician
 William Eyre (lieutenant-colonel) (died 1765), Battle of Lake George, Battle of Carillon
Sir William Eyre (British Army officer) (1805–1859), general in the British Army
William Eyre (painter) (1891–1979), English landscape painter
Rev. William Leigh Williamson Eyre (1841–1914), English naturalist and mycologist
Willie Eyre (born 1978), baseball player

See also
Eyre (surname)